Oumar Camara (born 19 August 1992) is a professional footballer who currently plays for China League One club Nantong Zhiyun as a midfielder. Born in France, he represented the Mauritania national team.

Club career
Camara trained as a youth with Le Havre AC, making appearances with their B team and training with the professional group. On leaving Le Havre he joined La Vitréenne FC in the fifth tier at the start of the 2012–13 season, but after issues over pay and a groin injury he left in November 2013 and returned to his home to train alone.

In the summer of 2013, Camara signed for fourth-level FC Chartres. In the 2014–15 season he played with ESM Gonfreville, enjoying a "quality season", which saw him attract the attention of US Orléans, for whom he signed in July 2015.

Camara signed his first professional contract with Orléans in the summer of 2016, before being loaned out to CA Bastia for the 2016–17 season. 

Following the clubs promotion, Camara made his debut at the professional level for Orléans in a 3–1 Ligue 2 win over AS Nancy on 28 July 2017. In January 2018 he joined Lyon Duchère on loan until the end of the season.

On 21 August 2018, Greek club Panionios officially announced the signing of Camara, until the end of 2018-19 season.

Released by Panionis in the summer of 2020, Camara was without a club until a successful trial with FC Sète 34 resulted in a contract.

On 12 August 2022, Camara joined China League One club Nantong Zhiyun.

International career
Camara is of Mauritanian descent. He was called up to represent the Mauritania national team for a set of friendlies in June 2021. He debuted with Mauritania in a 1–0 friendly win over Liberia on 11 June 2021.

References

External links
 
 
 
 Foot-National Profile

1992 births
Living people
People from Montivilliers
Association football midfielders
Citizens of Mauritania through descent
Mauritanian footballers
Mauritania international footballers
French footballers
French sportspeople of Mauritanian descent
Le Havre AC players
La Vitréenne FC players
FC Chartres players
ESM Gonfreville players
US Orléans players
CA Bastia players
Lyon La Duchère players
Panionios F.C. players
FC Sète 34 players
PFC Beroe Stara Zagora players
Nantong Zhiyun F.C. players
Ligue 2 players
Championnat National players
Championnat National 3 players
Super League Greece players
First Professional Football League (Bulgaria) players
China League One players
French expatriate footballers
Expatriate footballers in Greece
Expatriate footballers in Bulgaria
Expatriate footballers in China
Sportspeople from Seine-Maritime
2021 Africa Cup of Nations players
Footballers from Normandy